Zetech University is a private university located in Ruiru in Kiambu County, Kenya.Zetech was founded by Engineer Ken Mbiuki in 1999 and is registered by the Ministry of Higher Education Science and Technology.

In its early years, Zetech collaborated with the Jomo Kenyatta University of Agriculture and Technology to offer various programmes from the institution but after receiving a Letter of Interim Authority to operate as a University in 2014, the University started to offer its own programmes. The University is approved by The Commission for Higher Education.

The University comprises four faculties: 
School of Business and Economics, 
Faculty of ICT and Engineering, 
Department of Hospitality, Tourism, Education and Social Arts and 
the Department of Media Arts and Design.

The current chancellor is Professor Susan Alfano, and the Vice Chancellor is Professor Njenga Munene.

History
Although Zetech University was officially founded in 1999, Ken Mbiuki had been offering basic IT training in his dorm room since 1997, where he operated under the name Zenith Technologies while pursuing his undergraduate studies at the University of Nairobi. At the time, computing technology was fairly new in Kenya.

In 1999 Ken Mbiuki leased office space in Summit House and registered an academic institution under the name Zetech College – a fusion of the words 'Zenith' and 'Technology'. The college initially offered purely I.T.-based courses and has slowly grown over the years. It is now accredited as Zetech University by the Commission for University Education.

Campuses
Zetech University's main campus is located off Thika road in Ruiru, about 20 km from the capital city of Nairobi:

Thika Road Campus
The structured state-of-the-art University Complex in Ruiru, the Thika Road Campus, marks the transition of the college into a fully-fledged chartered university that will offer degree courses and award students a Zetech University Certificate upon the successful completion of their curriculum. Officially launched by the President of Kenya H.E President Uhuru Kenyatta.

Library
The 750-seat capacity library in the newly proposed Zetech University facility serves as Zetech's main Library, superior facilities including a library. The library can hold up to a total of 750 students. The facility comprises approximately 2,500 titles and incorporates computer-based learning support facilities to provide access to up-to-date research information. Also the library features wi-fi Internet access as well as an automated Integrated Library System. The same library collections are also housed in its Pioneer Campus Library.

Academic programmes
Zetech University offers a wide range of certificate, diploma, and degree programmes to government-sponsored and privately-funded students.

The University also provides digital learning through the Zetech Digital School.

Online blended learning
The University is keen on fulfilling the promise of timely completion, transitioning all its students and programmes to blended learning following the impact of COVID-19 on the higher education sector. Blended learning is the integration of classroom face-to-face learning experiences with online learning experiences. The collaborative training format incorporates different modes of training to mirror face to face learning, including live classes via the  BigBlueButton and other video conferencing platforms such as, WebEx and Zoom, online interactive classes via an interactive Learning Management System, pre-recorded videos from lecturers and online group sessions.

Enrollment
The University has intakes every January, May and September, enrolling both Government and self-sponsored students. 

The Zetech University student body is governed by the Zetech University Students' Association (ZUSA), which provides student representation within and outside the institution.

Sports and recreation
The University has robust football, basketball, rugby, and martial arts teams. Other sporting activities that students engage in include Volleyball, scrabble and chess. The football men's and ladies' teams are the reigning Universities and Colleges Football Leagues (UCFL) champions having won the 2018–19 titles. Additionally, the teams topped the Kenya Universities Sports Association (KUSA) 2018–19 games to emerge on top.

The Zetech University Basketball men's and ladies' team are doing well in the Kenya Basketball Federation (KBF) leagues after serving as the DSTV Kenya Basketball Federation Division One championships.

Clubs and societies
 Information Technology club
 Innovation and mentorship hub
 Zetech Christian Union
 Zetech Lions Club
 Engineering club 
 Entrepreneurs club
 Hotel Club
 Tourism club 
 Journalism club
 Community Development club
 Arts club
 Ajira club

Health and counseling
The university offers a Health and Counseling Centre which operates as a single service provider for professional medical and counseling services to students. The facility is open from 8 am to 6 pm and can handle emergencies such as chest pain, seizures, and injuries. They also educate students on various health emergency procedures for emergency purposes.

Religion
The Universities mandate is primarily the pursuit of secular education. The institution, however, subscribes to values of the Christian Faith. Students from diverse religious backgrounds are allowed to practice their faith without hindrance, so long as these practices do not make demands on or interfere with the smooth running of university operations, and university academic programs in particular. All students are expected to accord due respect and exhibit tolerance towards members of the different faiths.

References

1999 establishments in Kenya
Education in Nairobi
Educational institutions established in 1999
Private universities and colleges in Kenya